Sarin Darreh (also Romanized as Sarīn Darreh) is a village in Aq Bolagh Rural District, Sojas Rud District, Khodabandeh County, Zanjan Province, Iran. At the 2006 census, its population was 243, in 36 families.

References 

Populated places in Khodabandeh County